The Constantinople Flotilla was an Imperial German Navy formation set up during World War I to prosecute the U-boat campaign against Allied shipping in the Mediterranean and the Black Sea in support of Germany's ally, the Ottoman Empire. Despite its official name, the "U-boats of the Mediterranean Division in Constantinople" (U-Boote der Mittelmeerdivision in Konstantinopel), it saw little service there, operating mostly against Russian shipping in the Black Sea.

The Constantinople Flotilla had a maximum strength of 11 U–boats but due to the unfavorable conditions for commerce raiding in the Black Sea saw little success during its three years of operations. In three years of operation, the force sank ships totaling 117,093 GRT.

15 U-boats served in the Constantinople Flotilla; 7 were lost operationally: 5 in the Black Sea and 2 in the Mediterranean. One U-boat was sold to Bulgaria. Two more U-boats were assigned to the Flotilla but were lost en route to Constantinople.

In 1917 the force was amalgamated with the Pola Flotilla, coming under the command of the  U-boat Leader, Mediterranean (Führer der U-boote im Mittelmeer) there; the unit was renamed the  Constantinople Half-Flotilla (U-Halbflotille Konstantinopel).

In 1918, with the collapse of the Central Powers, the U-boats were scuttled or fled to join the Pola boats in their evacuation to Germany.

List of U-boats
 U-21
 U-33
 U-38
 UB-3*
 UB-7
 UB-8
 UB-14
 UB-42
 UB-45
 UB-44*
 UB-46
 UB-66
 UB-68
 UC-13
 UC-15
 UC-23
 UC-37

Commanding officers

References

VE Tarrant The U-Boat offensive 1914-1945 (1989)  

U-boat flotillas
Military units and formations of the Imperial German Navy
Naval units and formations of Germany in World War I
Mediterranean naval operations of World War I
Military units and formations established in 1915
Military units and formations disestablished in 1918
Black Sea naval operations of World War I